Hajia Gambo Sawaba (15 February 1933 – October 2001)  was a Nigerian  women's rights activist, politician and philanthropist. She served as the deputy chairman of Great Nigeria People's Party (GNPP) and was elected leader of the national women's wing of Northern Element Progressive Union (NEPU).

Background

Parents
Hajia Sawaba was born to Isa Amartey Amarteifio (christened Theophilus Wilcox) who was an immigrant from Ghana and Fatima Amarteifio, a Nupe woman from Lavun Local Government, Niger State. Amarteifo was a graduate of Ghana School of Survey who immigrated to Nigeria in 1910 and sought to be employed by the Nigerian Railway Corporation. Fatima's great grand father was a blacksmith as well as a warrior who gave birth to Mamman Dazu, their grand father. Mamman Dazu is said to have been a great warrior and widely consulted.

Birth
Isa Amartey Amarteifio was converted to Islam upon getting to Zaria and met with Fatima  after some years whom he married. Fatima was a widow and already had 3 children with Mohammadu Alao her then deceased husband. Their marriage was consummated with 6 children of whom Sawaba was the 5th. She was called Hajaratu while according to the Hausa naming custom, any child born after the birth of twins was called Gambo, hence the name Hajaratu Gambo.

Early life and education
She was educated at the Native Authority Primary School in Tudun, Wada. She however had to stop schooling after the loss of her father in 1943 who dies complaining of headache and her mother 3 years after.  She was married off at age 13 to a World War II veteran Abubakar Garba Bello who left and never returned after her first pregnancy. Quite noticeable about her when she was a child, was her unusual interest in mad people. She spoke with them, accommodated some and gave the ones she could money, clothes and food. As a child she was often described as stubborn and heady and almost always got into street brawls. According to her "I could not stand by to watch a weak friend or relation being molested." She said used to take over such fights. Whenever she got to the scenes of such fights, she would immediately say “OK, I have bought the fight from you” to the weaker person and take over the fight.

Political career and activism
Sawaba was involved in politics since she was 17. During that time, northern Nigeria was dominated by the Northern People's Congress, which had the support of the Emirs and British Colonial Authority but she joined the opposition group Northern Element Progressive Union (NEPU). She was a campaigner against under-aged marriages, forced labour and an advocated for western education in the north. Gambo made a name for herself when at a political lecture during her career in the North, she climbed up and spoke out in a room full of men. She was mentored by Funmilayo Ransome-Kuti and traveled to meet her in Abeokuta years later. She is widely regarded as the pioneer of fighting for the liberation of northern women. Sawaba was not her birth name. Meaning freedom or redemption, it was given to her by her political mentor, Malam Aminu Kano, after she had been elected president general of NEPU’s women’s wing.

Personal life and legacy
She was married off at age 13 to a World War II veteran Abubakar Garba Bello who left and never returned after her first pregnancy. Subsequent marriages didn't last as the marriage between her and Hamidu Gusau was called off due to violent fighting between the two. Others also didn't work out. A general hospital was named after her in Kaduna.
A hostel at Bayero University, Kano is also named after her.

Imprisonment 
She was imprisoned 16 times for openly advocating against child marriage, forced and unpaid labour and unfair taxes, and canvassed for jobs for women, education for girls and full voting rights. She was also rated as the most jailed Nigerian female 1

References

Nigerian women activists
People from Zaria
1933 births
2001 deaths